J.Krishnapuram is a Panchayat village in Sulur Taluk of Kamanaicken Palayam in Coimbatore district, Tamil Nadu, India.It is near to Senjery  hills. Livelihood of most of the population in this village is self employment in agriculture (coconut, maize, vegetables etc.).

References

Villages in Coimbatore district